Svalbard Airport is the main airport serving Svalbard in Norway. The first airport near Longyearbyen was constructed during World War II. In 1959, it was first used for occasional flights, but could only be used a few months a year. Construction of the new airport at Hotellneset started in 1973, and the airport was opened on 2 September 1975. It is owned and operated by state-owned Avinor.

In 2014, the airport handled 154,261 passengers. Scandinavian Airlines operates daily flights to Tromsø and Oslo in mainland Norway. Lufttransport provides services to the two other airports on Svalbard: Ny-Ålesund and Svea, using Dornier 228 turboprop aircraft. There are also regular charter flights.

History

Adventdalen
The first airstrip on Svalbard was constructed in Adventdalen, near Longyearbyen, by the Luftwaffe during World War II. It was not used immediately after the war; during the summer the archipelago was served by ships but was completely isolated from November to May. In the early 1950s, the Norwegian Air Force started postal flights using a Catalina aircraft that departed from Tromsø and dropped postal parcels at Bear Island and at Longyearbyen. However, these aircraft never landed until 9 February 1959, when a resident had become seriously ill and needed to be flown to mainland Norway for treatment. The mining company Store Norske Spitsbergen Kulkompani cleared the runway at Adventsdalen and the 14-hour flight and landing were successful. A second landing, this time for delivery of post, was made on 11 March.

While the Catalina was suitable for postal flights, it was not suitable as a permanent solution for transporting passengers and freight, mainly due to its small size. Store Norske contacted the domestic airline Braathens SAFE for a regular service. A Douglas DC-4 flew the first trial flight on 2 April 1959, with 54 passengers from Bardufoss Airport. Store Norske had cleared a  runway for the aircraft. The next flight occurred in 1962, followed by another in 1963 and two in 1964.

Due to lack of runway lights, flights were only permitted during daylight. This hindered flights during parts of December and January when the sun never rises. By April, the runway ice would begin melting as the sun would appear allowing flights during the summer. Navigation was conducted using radio signals from Bear Island and Isfjord.

The first night landing was made on 8 December 1965. A DC-4 took off from the new Tromsø Airport and delivered the mail at Bear Island before continuing to Longyearbyen. The runway was lit up using paraffin lamps and lights from cars parked along the runway. A radio transmitter was also installed at Hotellneset. During the 1965–66 season, Braathens SAFE made 16 flights to Svalbard. The following two seasons, a contract was awarded to Scandinavian Airlines System (SAS), but after that, the contract reverted to Braathens SAFE. Fred. Olsen Airtransport made its first flight to Svalbard in 1966. By 1969, a total of 50 flights had been made to Svalbard, and by 1972, the 100th was made. By then, Braathens SAFE had started using Douglas DC-6B aircraft. During these years, Store Norske also installed permanent lights. The first jet plane to land in Adventdalen was a Fred Olsen Flyselskap Dassault Falcon 20, LN-FOI. The landing was in 1971, and the aircraft brought in 1700 lbs of mail and passengers, picking up a geological survey party. A Fokker F-28 landed on 29 April 1972. From 1974, Boeing 737-200C aircraft were taken into use. They had a side cargo door, allowing easy loading of cargo into the main cabin. Aeroflot started flights to Adventdalen in 1973 to serve the neighboring Russian community of Barentsburg.

Hotellneset

The Svalbard Treaty specifies that no military installations are permitted on the archipelago. The Soviet authorities were concerned that a permanent civilian airport could also be used by Norwegian and NATO forces. But the Soviets also needed an airport to serve their settlements at Barentsburg and Pyramiden, and by the early 1970s, an understanding was reached between the two countries.

Construction started in 1973. The airport needed to be built on permafrost. The runway is insulated against the ground, so it will not melt during the summer. The hangar is frozen into the ground, with the pillars being melted into place and then being frozen stuck. The runway was plagued with frost heaves due to an incorrect construction method, forcing the airport to regularly re-asphalt the runway. In 1989, parts of the runway were re-insulated, repairing those areas that previously had been the worst of an acceptable solution. In 2006, this solution was administered to the remaining parts of the runway. An upgrade to the terminal building to allow larger capacity was completed in 2007.

Services

Both Braathens SAFE and SAS applied for the concession to fly from the mainland to Norway. This was granted to SAS, who would have one weekly service. Braathens SAFE continued to fly charter flights for the Norwegian coal mining company, Store Norske. In this way, the airport was useful until the official opening. The first landing at the new airport was made on 14 September 1974 with a Fokker F-28, and Braathens SAFE continued to fly until 1 September 1975. Russian authorities granted a concession for a semi-weekly service by Aeroflot from Murmansk Airport. The first attempt to officially open the airport was made with an SAS Douglas DC-9 on 14 August 1975. Among the guests on board was King Olav V, but thick fog at Longyearbyen forced the airplane to return. On 1 September, a Fokker F-27 from Braathens SAFE was used to calibrate the runways; on board were pilots from SAS and Aeroflot to learn about the landing conditions. The following day, the second attempt to open the airport was successful. In addition to the scheduled services, Store Norske chartered cargo flights from Fred Olsen Air Transport.

Lufttransport has been at the airport since 1976. In 1984, two Bell 212 helicopters were stationed at the airport on contract with the Governor of Svalbard. The company signed an agreement with the Norwegian Coast Guard to have a Partenavia Spartacus planes stationed at Longyearbyen for fishery surveillance. Since 1994, the company has had a Dornier 228 stationed at the airport, and two since 2001.

On 14 August 1987, Braathens SAFE re-entered the market, flying in parallel with SAS to Tromsø and Oslo. For the first time, the scheduled flights to Oslo were offered as day flights instead of the night flights offered by SAS. In 2002, after SAS bought Braathens, the subsidiary took over all flights to Longyearbyen for the group. From May 2004, they merged to SAS Braathens, that again became SAS from 1 June 2007. From 1 April to 1 November 2004, Norwegian Air Shuttle introduced three weekly services from Longyearbyen to Tromsø and Oslo, using Boeing 737-300 aircraft, but the service was terminated due to low loads. A new service was started on 27 March 2008, with two direct services to Oslo, using larger Boeing 737-800 aircraft. but again the route was terminated later the same year. , Norwegian is again flying to Svalbard from Oslo. Finnair announced plans to begin flights from Helsinki in summer 2016, but Norwegian authorities did not allow this route as it was not in bilateral agreement on air traffic between Finland and Norway.

Norway has decided that from October 2017, Svalbard Airport shall not have international status, meaning that aircraft from other countries than Norway are not permitted anymore. As an exception, Russian aircraft are still allowed due to a treaty with Russia. The reason is that the airport is not in line with guidelines for international airports, because this is considered too costly for Norway.

Facilities

The airport also serves the nearby Russian settlement of Barentsburg. Mainland Norway is part of the Schengen Area, but Svalbard is excluded. At the airport, no passport control is carried out, although exit checks are performed in Oslo or Tromsø. A passport, a national ID card from an EU/EFTA country, Monaco or San Marino, or a Norwegian driving licence/photo bank card/military ID card is needed.

There are 200 free outdoor parking spaces at the airport. Taxis, rental cars and airport coaches are also available (a shuttle bus operates to hotels and guesthouses in Longyearbyen and Nybyen). Scandinavian Airlines provides handling services through SAS Ground Services.

About one-third of the runway is dug into the terrain, while about two-thirds is built on an embankment.

Airlines and destinations

Lufttransport has a base at Svalbard Airport with two 19-seat Dornier 228-202K aircraft and 15 employees. The airline flies daily trips to Ny-Ålesund Airport, Hamnerabben on behalf of Kings Bay with research personnel and about thirty trips per week to Svea Airport on behalf of Store Norske Spitsbergen Kulkompani with mining personnel. These routes involve transport of 21,000 passengers and 500 tonnes of cargo per year. On behalf of the Norwegian Coast Guard, Lufttransport flies about 400 hours annual of aerial surveillance. Scandinavian Airlines and Norwegian Air Shuttle flies six times a week to Tromsø Airport and onwards to Oslo Airport, Gardermoen using a Boeing 737-800 aircraft. The Barentsburg mine has a Mi-8 helicopter used for travel to and from the Longyearbyen airport and more.  The Svalbard Global Seed Vault is located a few miles south of the airport.

Statistics

Accidents and incidents 
On 10 October 1986, a Cessna 185 from Antarctax crashed immediately after leaving Svalbard Airport en route to Ny-Ålesund, killing all six on board.
All 141 people on board the Tupolev Tu-154M died. It is the worst air crash in Norwegian history.

References

Sources

External links

Airports in Svalbard
Airports established in 1975
Avinor airports
Longyearbyen
1975 establishments in Norway